The 2013–14 season was Sepahan's 13th season in the Pro League, and their 20th consecutive season in the top division of Iranian Football and 60th year in existence as a football club. They also competed in the Hazfi Cup and the AFC Champions League. Sepahan was captained by Moharram Navidkia.

Players
Last updated on 14 July 2014

Transfers 
Last updated on 31 December 2013

Summer 

In:

 

Out:

Winter 

In:

Out:

Technical staff

|}

Statistics
Last updated on 21 May 2014

Players performance 

 Friendlies and Pre season matches are not considered in table data.

Disciplinary record

Clean sheets

Own goals

Overall statistics

Competitions
Last updated on 13 July 2014

Overview

Iran Pro League

Standings

Results summary

Results by round

Matches

Hazfi Cup

AFC Champions League

Group stage

Friendly Matches

See also
 2014 AFC Champions League
 2013–14 Persian Gulf Cup
 2013–14 Hazfi Cup

References

External links
Iran Premier League Statistics
Persian League

Sepahan S.C. seasons
Sepahan